Cuckoos Nest railway station is a station/halt on the Minimum Gauge Whistlestop Valley in West Yorkshire, Northern England.
It also serves the village of Scissett.

References 
 Kirklees Light Railway

Heritage railway stations in Kirklees
Railway stations built for UK heritage railways
Denby Dale